Karth is a surname. Notable people called Karth include:

Brita Persdotter Karth, fictional person in Swedish history
Dick Karth (born 1952), American historic motorsport and stock car racing driver
Dieter Delle Karth (born 1944), Austrian bobsledder
Georg Karth (born 1884), German gymnast
Joseph Karth (1922–2005), U.S. Representative from Minnesota
Nico Delle Karth (born 1984), Austrian sailor
Walter Delle Karth (born 1946), Austrian bobsledder
Werner Delle Karth, Austrian bobsledder
Walter Delle Karth Sr. (1911–2004), Austrian skier

See also
Defossé & Karth, French wallpaper company
Kurth (disambiguation)